Luke of Lies is a Nigerian movie which tells the story of three friends who try to find ways and means to steal from the rich in order to enrich themselves.

References

Nigerian crime drama films
2015 films